Stedelijk Museum ('city museum') most often refers to Stedelijk Museum Amsterdam, Netherlands.

Stedelijk Museum may also refer to:

Belgium
 Stedelijk Museum voor Actuele Kunst, Ghent
 Stedelijk Museum "Peter Benoit", Harelbeke
 Stedelijk Museum Wuyts-Van Campen en Baron Caroly, Lier

Netherlands
 Stedelijk Museum Alkmaar
 Stedelijk Museum Bureau Amsterdam, part of Stedelijk Museum Amsterdam
 Stedelijk Museum Breda
 Van Abbemuseum, Eindhoven, formerly Stedelijk Van Abbemuseum
 Stedelijk Museum Kampen
 Stedelijk Museum 's-Hertogenbosch